"April Skies" is a song by Scottish alternative rock group the Jesus and Mary Chain and the first single from the group's second studio album, Darklands (1987). The song was released by Blanco y Negro Records in April 1987, reaching  8 on the UK Single Chart, No. 6 in Ireland, and No. 16 in New Zealand, making it the band's highest-charting single in all three countries.

Track listings
All tracks were written by Jim Reid and William Reid except where noted.

7-inch single (NEG24)
A. "April Skies"
B. "Kill Surf City"

Limited-edition 2×7-inch single (NEG24F)
A. "April Skies"
B. "Kill Surf City"
C. "Mushroom" (live in Nuremberg 1986) 
D. "Bo Diddley Is Jesus"

12-inch single (NEG24T)
A1. "April Skies" (long version)
B1. "Kill Surf City"
B2. "Who Do You Love?"

Personnel
The Jesus and Mary Chain
 Jim Reid – vocals, guitar
 William Reid – guitar, producer

Additional personnel
 Bill Price – production (track 1)
 John Loder – production (tracks 2 to 4)
 Linda Reid – design
  Helen Backhouse – design

Charts

References

The Jesus and Mary Chain songs
1987 singles
1987 songs
Blanco y Negro Records singles
Songs written by Jim Reid
Songs written by William Reid (musician)